The Forward Party, also known simply as Forward (FWD), is a centrist political party in the United States. Forward has one political party affiliate at the state level seeking to achieve ballot access. It seeks to have affiliates with ballot access in 29 other states by 2023 and ballot access in all 50 states by 2024. 

The party, which was founded by former Democratic 2020 presidential and 2021 New York City mayoral candidate Andrew Yang, describes its goals as the reduction of partisan polarization and implementing electoral reforms. Forward was officially formed as a political action committee (PAC) on October 5, 2021. The PAC intends to seek recognition from the Federal Election Commission as a political party to achieve its stated goal of providing an alternative to the two major U.S. political parties. It also states that, for the time being, candidates affiliated with the organization will remain members of the two major American political parties and America's third parties, as well as independent candidates. 

On July 27, 2022, the Forward Party announced that it had merged with the Serve America Movement and the Renew America Movement to further its effort to form a new third party named "Forward".

History

Founding and early history (2021–2022)

In Yang's 2021 book, Forward: Notes on the Future of Our Democracy, he announced the creation of the party. Yang also criticized American political leaders, writing that "our leaders are rewarded based not on solving problems but on accruing resources and retaining office."

Yang said that part of the reason why he wanted to start a third party instead of a caucus within the Democratic Party, was that a majority of states with ballot initiatives are red states, and that efforts to institute electoral changes would be partisan and not system-wide. Yang stated that he would have liked to have implemented the Forward Party's platform within the Democratic Party. However, he felt that the implementation of ranked-choice voting and open primaries would be difficult to get while remaining a Democrat.

The Forward Party claims that it will endorse candidates of both major parties in the 2022 elections who support its policies. Yang states that the Forward Party will not serve a spoiler because it will endorse any Democrats and Republicans who support the party's platform. The Forward Party website suggests that candidates affiliated with the Forward Party will likely run as a member of one of the two major parties.
Yang stated that the Forward Party is not interested in running a candidate for president, but is focused on trying to decrease partisan gridlock within Congress and state legislatures. The Forward Party has stated it may hold its own primary process to nominate a candidate prior to the 2024 United States presidential election. The party's initial team included former congressional candidate Blair Walsingham and attorney Jeff Kurzon.

In February 2022, The Forward Party chose Minnesota as the first state to launch an affiliate party. According to Yang, Minnesota was chosen because there are "open primaries, public resources for candidates [and the state has] an independent spirit." The Minnesota affiliate is being headed by John Denney, who ran for Congress in 2014 as a member of the Independence Party of Minnesota. Denney attempted to get Richard Painter, who served as the chief White House ethics lawyer in the George W. Bush administration, to run as a member of the Forward Party in the 2022 Minnesota Attorney General election. Cory Hepola, a radio host, announced he was running for Governor of Minnesota as a member of the Forward Party in 2022. He later withdrew from the race.

Mergers (2022–present)
In July 2022, the Forward Party, Renew America Movement, and Serve America Movement, announced that they would be merging in an attempt to form a new third party. The new party, Forward, would be co-chaired by Yang and former New Jersey Governor Christine Todd Whitman. Shortly after launching, former Pennsylvania Democratic Representative Joe Sestak and former Florida Republican Representative David Jolly both announced they would be joining the party. They have also announced that the party would launch on September 24, 2022, with its first national convention in summer 2023.

The Forward Party's affiliate, the Griebel-Frank for CT Party, appeared on the gubernatorial ballot in the 2022 Connecticut gubernatorial election. They endorsed incumbent Governor Ned Lamont.

The Forward Party has no plans to run a candidate for President in 2024 and plans on working to elect state and local officials. 
The party stated they will "do anything we can to make sure that Donald Trump does not get near the White House."

Political positions

Early positions
The party's original platform included instituting 18-year term limits for members of Congress. It also sought to establish a new cabinet-level Department of Technology. The party supported civic juries and advocated for a "citizens' portal". The party supported data as a property right. The party called for an economy based on "human-centered capitalism", the enactment of universal basic income, and support for alternative forms of measuring economic progress. 

The party advocated for automatic tax filing. Forward's former platform supported the implementation of a universal health care system, and it encouraged states to adopt nonpartisan primaries and implement ranked-choice voting, a concept Yang draws from political theorist and businesswoman Katherine Gehl called Final-Five Voting. It also proposed independent redistricting commissions and public finance reform in the form of democracy dollars. The party encourages people to maintain their membership in the Democratic and Republican parties as to not disenfranchise them by leaving them unable to vote in party primaries. As a consequence, Forward plans to endorse candidates from both major parties, third parties, as well as independents who advocate for the core values rather than field their own.

Current positions after mergers 
Upon merging with the Serve America Movement and the Renew America Movement, Forward eliminated its party platform and instead announced they will take an approach that seeks common ground among Americans. Joel Searby, Forward's National Director, said that the party does not plan on taking positions on controversial issues such as guns and abortion; instead they will leave those issues up to candidates and state and local chapters to decide. Steve Brawner, a freelance journalist and syndicated columnist, also said that "We think that Americans want and need a party that speaks to the needs of their local communities and gives elected officials the flexibility to meet those needs, instead of a rigid, top-down platform that prescribes exactly what you have to believe about any given issue..."

Forward does take a specific stance on electoral and democratic reform. The party supports:
Open primaries
Independent redistricting commissions
Ranked-choice voting
STAR voting
Approval voting

Reception and criticisms 
The Forward Party has faced criticism from some Democrats, who believe the party could cause vote splitting and benefit Republicans in most jurisdictions, which still use a plurality voting system. Luke Savage of Jacobin criticized the conception of the party as "pseudo-populism that's ultimately more an effort at rebranding the status quo than overthrowing it." MSNBC opinion columnist Zeeshan Aleem called the Forward Party "an uninspiring mess lacking vision or purpose". Natalie Shure of The New Republic characterized the party as "vapid" and a "political stunt", asking "why bother going through the trouble of building a third party if its creation is the only thing it intends to accomplish?" Andrew Gawthorpe writing in The Guardian stated that the Forward Party is "likely to collapse under the weight of its own contradictions" as a new third party would not address more fundamental political problems in the United States. Instead, he suggests that the Democratic Party is the only viable political party that could counter the “threat to U.S. democracy” posed by Republicans. Political commentator Matthew Dowd tweeted, "Serious question @AndrewYang what changed about Democratic party since you ran less than two years ago as a Democrat for President and last year as a Democrat for mayor?  I mean other than (the) fact voters rejected you."

In contrast, New York Times opinion writer Kara Swisher praised Yang's book Forward: Notes on the Future of Our Democracy, which inspired the pre-July 2022 positions of the party. She wrote: "Yang does not just give us a laundry list of intractable problems, but shows how we can find solutions if we think in new ways and summon the courage to do so."

See also 
Similar parties in the United States:
 Alliance Party
 Reform Party of the United States of America
 Unity Party of America
Similar parties outside the United States:
 Basic Income Party (South Korea)
Other:
 A Call for American Renewal
 Lesser of two evils principle – strategy opposing third parties in a political duopoly

References

External links
Official website
Andrew Yang's announcement of the creation of the Forward Party

Forward
Forward
Centrist political parties in the United States
Forward
Forward
Forward
Forward
Forward
Forward
Political parties supporting universal basic income